The Ashchysu is a river in the Abai Region, Kazakhstan and a tributary of the Shagan, of the Irtysh basin.

Geography 
It heads initially westwards, then it bends southwestwards and passes Ushbiik, then, in its lower course it bends again and heads roughly northwestwards. Finally it meets the right bank of the Shagan  to the southwest of Semey, former Semipalatinsk, city. The confluence is located on the Balapan field of the Semipalatinsk Test Site complex. A lake was formed as a result of an experimental nuclear explosion to create a reservoir in January 1965.

The Ashchysu is fed mainly by snow and in the summer it often dries up.

See also
List of rivers of Kazakhstan
Lake Shagan

References

External links
Radioactive contamination of the Shagan River ecosystem
Trip on lake Atomic

Rivers of Kazakhstan